The 2021–22 Indian State Leagues season represented a series of highest state-level football tournaments played as qualifiers to determine teams for the 2022–23 season of I-League 2.

The leagues were supposed to be completed before the next season starts, so state football associations can nominate the teams available for promotion.

Overview

Confirmed nominees
The following clubs were confirmed by the state football associations for the 2022–23 season of I-League 2.

State leagues and standings

Bihar

Delhi

Goa

Phase-1

Himachal Pradesh

Karnataka

Kerala

Knockout stage

Madhya Pradesh

Super four

Maharashtra

Manipur

Knockout stage

Meghalaya
2022 Shillong Premier League

Punjab

Tamil Nadu

West Bengal

Knockout stage

See also
2021–22 Indian Super League
2021–22 I-League

References

2021–22 in Indian football leagues
2021–22 in Indian football